Baga Nuur (small lake) is a lake in the Zavkhan Aimag in Mongolia, separated from Khar lake by a band of sand dunes, the estimated terrain elevation above sea level is 1131 metres.

Variant forms of spelling for Baga Nuur or in other languages 
Pa-ha Po

Ozero Baga-nur

Baga noru Mizu-umi

Pu-ch’ia No-erh

Lake Baga-kur

Ozero Baga-Nor

Pa-ka Hu

Baga Nuur

Baga Nuur

Baga noru Mizu-umi

Lake Baga-kur

Ozero Baga-Nor

Ozero Baga-nur

Pa-ha Po

Pa-ka Hu

Pu-ch'ia No-erh

Pu-ch’ia No-erh.

References

Lakes of Mongolia